Grinnell Land is the central section of Ellesmere Island in the northernmost part of Nunavut territory in Canada.  It was named for Henry Grinnell, a shipping magnate from New York, who in the 1850s helped finance two expeditions to search for Franklin's lost expedition.

The name was given by Captain Edwin De Haven during the First Grinnell Expedition upon sighting the high grounds in September 1850.  He beheld the landmass on the 22nd of that month, which was distinguished by its mountain tops which were seen to be "rising above the clouds."  De Haven substantiated the name in his official report of the voyage, dated October 1851.

Grinnell Land is part of Quttinirpaaq National Park.

Fort Conger is located the northern shore of Lady Franklin Bay in Grinnell Land, across Bellot Island.

Notes

References
Merriam-Webster's Geographical Dictionary, Third Edition. Springfield, Massachusetts: Merriam-Webster, Incorporated, 1997. .

Ellesmere Island